The Czech Republic has participated in the Eurovision Young Dancers 7 times since its debut in 1999. The Czech Republic has hosted the contest twice, in 2015 and in 2017.

Participation overview

Hostings

See also
Czech Republic in the Eurovision Song Contest
Czech Republic in the Eurovision Young Musicians

References

External links 
 Eurovision Young Dancers

Countries in the Eurovision Young Dancers